The canton of Erstein is a canton of France, located in the Bas-Rhin department, in the Grand Est region. Since the French canton reorganisation which came into effect in March 2015, the communes of the canton of Erstein are:

 Benfeld
 Bolsenheim
 Boofzheim
 Daubensand
 Diebolsheim
 Erstein
 Friesenheim
 Gerstheim
 Herbsheim
 Hindisheim
 Hipsheim
 Huttenheim
 Ichtratzheim
 Kertzfeld
 Kogenheim
 Limersheim
 Matzenheim
 Nordhouse
 Obenheim
 Osthouse
 Rhinau
 Rossfeld
 Sand
 Schaeffersheim
 Sermersheim
 Uttenheim
 Westhouse
 Witternheim

See also 
 Cantons of the Bas-Rhin department

References

Erstein